1928 was the 35th season of County Championship cricket in England. The first Test series between England and West Indies team in England was won 3–0 by the host nation. Lancashire completed a hat-trick of titles.

Honours
County Championship – Lancashire
Minor Counties Championship – Berkshire
Wisden – Leslie Ames, George Duckworth, Maurice Leyland, Sam Staples, Jack White

Test series

West Indies made its first Test Match tour of England and were hopelessly outclassed by the hosts, who won all three Tests by an innings.

County Championship

Leading batsmen
Douglas Jardine topped the averages with 1133 runs @ 87.15

Leading bowlers
Harold Larwood topped the averages with 138 wickets @ 14.51

References

Annual reviews
 Wisden Cricketers' Almanack 1929

External links
 CricketArchive – season summary

1928 in English cricket
English cricket seasons in the 20th century